Isaak Iosifovic Revzin (1923–1974) was a Russian linguist and semiotician associated with the Tartu–Moscow Semiotic School.

Life
Isaac Revzin was born in Istanbul. He worked at the Institute of Foreign Languages. A structural linguist, he proposed that linguistics be developed as a formal axiomatic theory. Despite the fact that he was a specialist in machine translation, he only saw a computer (and from a distance) once in his life. He also wrote in collaboration with his wife, Olga Revzina. He died in Moscow.

His son, Grigory Revzin, living in Moscow, is an art critic and a journalist.

Works
 (with Olga Revzina) 'Expérimentation sémiotique chez Eugene Ionesco', Semiotica 4 (1960), pp. 240–262.
 'The relationship between structural and statistical methods in modern linguistics', Foreign developments in machine translation and information processing, 1961, pp. 43–53
 Models of language, London: Methuen, 1966. Translated by N. F. C. Owen and A. S. C. Ross from the Russian Modeli jazyka (1962).
 (with others) The fundamentals of human and machine translations, 1966

References

1923 births
1974 deaths
Linguists from the Soviet Union
Russian semioticians
20th-century linguists
Turkish emigrants to the Soviet Union